The HB-Flugtechnik HB-208 Amigo is an Austrian ultralight aircraft that was designed by Heino Brditschka and produced by HB-Flugtechnik of Ansfelden. The aircraft is supplied as a kit for amateur construction or as a complete ready-to-fly-aircraft.

The design was the company's first microlight and led to further work in that field.

Design and development
The aircraft was designed to comply with the Fédération Aéronautique Internationale microlight rules and amateur-built rules. It features a strut-braced high-wing, a two-seats-in-side-by-side configuration enclosed cockpit, fixed tricycle landing gear and a single engine in tractor configuration.

The fuselage is made from welded steel tubing, the wing built from wood with its flying surfaces covered in doped aircraft fabric. Standard engines are the  Rotax 912UL and the  Rotax 912ULS four-stroke powerplants.

Specifications (Amigo UL)

See also
ICP Amigo, a different aircraft with the same model name

References

External links

2000s Austrian ultralight aircraft
Homebuilt aircraft
Single-engined tractor aircraft
Amigo
High-wing aircraft